Craig Drennen (born 1966) is an American artist based in Atlanta, Georgia.  He is best known for his ongoing long-term Timon of Athens project, for which he has produced paintings, drawings, prints, videos, performances, sculptures.  His work shows technical agility across a wide range of influences that spans abstraction, representation, and conceptual practices.  In a catalog essay, the curator Diana Nawi writes that Drennen's "…multifaceted, dense, and ambitious practice suggests a world of meaning defined by symbols that emerge in different media and coalesce across projects."

Early life 
Craig Drennen was born in Elyria, Ohio, and raised in central West Virginia. He accumulated academic accolades in West Virginia, but little of his early life is documented.  He graduated from Glenville State College (WV) and Ohio University (OH) with an MFA in Painting & Art History.  He was a 2006 participant at the Skowhegan School of Painting & Sculpture.

As a child, he was a brilliant student and avid artist. Mr Drennen was also a gifted athlete, until a incident.

Career 
Craig Drennen lived in New York City for much of the 1990s where he worked as an art handler at the Guggenheim Museum, National Academy Museum, and International Center for Photography among places. He shared a studio on west 27th Street and produced artwork that he showed with Sarah Meltzer Gallery, Christinerose Gallery, and Momenta Art.  He taught courses at the School of Visual Arts, Long Island University, and Kingsborough Community College.   He worked at different times for the artists Keith Sonnier and Sandy Skoglund.  He assisted Clarissa Dalrymple and managed her booth in the first Gramercy Art Fair at the Gramercy Hotel in 1994.  He began writing art criticism for New York Arts and Cover magazines.  He was a teaching artist at the Dia Center for the Arts in Chelsea then accepted a position as the Dia education coordinator in 1998.

Drennen relocated to Georgia in fall 1999 and began to participate in artist residencies for the first time.  In December 2002 he was awarded a residency at the Vermont Studio Center where he began what would be his first long-term, multi-year artistic project based on the failed 1984 movie Supergirl.  He worked for nearly six years on the Supergirl project and produced drawings, paintings, sculptural multiples, and audio pieces.  He showed the Supergirl work in at least four solo gallery exhibitions and it marks the first mature body of work in his career.

In 2008 Drennen began his Timon of Athens project.   Since 2009 he has had solo exhibitions at Samsøñ gallery in Boston, Saltworks in Atlanta, Ellen de Bruijne Projects in Amsterdam, and Brooklyn Fire Proof gallery in New York City.  He has been included in group exhibitions at the Torrance Art Museum in California, P.P.O.W. in New York City, as well the High Museum in Atlanta.  He has had work included in the Aqua art fair in Miami, the MACO art fair in Mexico City, and the VoltaBasel art fair in Basel, Switzerland.  His work has been reviewed in The New York Times, the Boston Globe, Artforum, and Art in America magazines, among others.  He has continued to attend artist residency programs such as the Triangle Art Foundation, the Hambidge Center, Yaddo, and the MacDowell Colony.  In 2018 he was awarded a Guggenheim Fellowship.

Teaching 
Drennen served four years (2010–12, 2016) as Dean at the Skowhegan School of Painting and Sculpture in Skowhegan, Maine and currently teaches at Georgia State University in Atlanta, Georgia.  Since 2014 he has taught workshops at the Anderson Ranch Art Center in Snowmass, CO.

Awards 
 2018 – Guggenheim Fellowship
 2016 – MOCA GA Working Artist Project
 2015 – Art Matters grant
 2015 – MacDowell fellow
 2013 – Yaddo residency
 2013 – Hambidge Center residency
 2012 – Triangle Workshop (New York City)
 2011 – Southeastern College Art Conference Artist Fellowship
 2011 – Flux Projects artist grant
 2010 – Ohio University Distinguished Alumni Award
 2006 – Skowhegan School of Painting & Sculpture
 2003 – Triangle Residency (Brooklyn)
 2002 – Vermont Studio Center

Exhibition catalogs 
 Drennen, C. Nawi, Diana. Craig Drennen: BANDIT. published by MOCA GA. Atlanta. 2018
 Horodner, S. Painters Painting. DVD exhibition catalog. 31 minutes. 2012
 Drennen, C. Grabner, M. Timon of Athens. published by Samsøn. Boston. 2011.

Bibliography 
 Weiskopf, Dan. "Each Thing's a Thief: Craig Drennen’s ‘BANDIT’ at MOCA GA.” Burnaway. January 12, 2018
 StoryCorps Booth recording with Ed Hall.  Burnaway. December 12, 2017
 Fischer, Marc. "A Conversation With Craig Drennen." Figure/Ground. Dec 2016
 Asper, Colleen. "Poets, Painters, and Servants: An Interview with Craig Drennen.” Art Pulse 21
 Locke, Steve. “One Question: Craig Drennen,” Art And Everything After, January 29, 2014
 Wilson, Michael. "New American Painting Spotlight: Craig Drennen speaks to Michael Wilson.” New American Painting. Vol 106, summer 2013
 Reese, Rachel. "Drennen of Atlanta." Bomb Magazine. January 17, 2013.
 Dimling Cochran, Rebecca. "Craig Drennen: Saltworks.” Art in America. May 2012
 Miller, Francine. “Craig Drennen: Samsøn.” Artforum.  Feb 2011
 "Letter to Peter Schjeldahl." The Village Voice. August 26, 1997

References

External links 
 

1966 births
Living people
Glenville State College alumni
Ohio University alumni
People from Elyria, Ohio
Painters from New York City
Artists from Atlanta
Georgia State University faculty
20th-century American painters
20th-century American sculptors
21st-century American sculptors
21st-century American painters
21st-century American male artists
Sculptors from New York (state)
20th-century American male artists